Luiz Gonzaga do Nascimento (standard orthography 'Luís'; ; Exu, December 13, 1912 – Recife, August 2, 1989) was a Brazilian singer, songwriter, musician and poet and one of the most influential figures of Brazilian popular music in the twentieth century. He has been credited with having presented the rich universe of Northeastern musical genres to all of Brazil, having popularized the musical genre baião and has been called a "revolutionary" by Antônio Carlos Jobim. According to Caetano Veloso, he was the first significant cultural event with mass appeal in Brazil. Luiz Gonzaga received the Shell prize for Brazilian Popular Music in 1984 and was only the fourth artist to receive this prize after Pixinguinha, Antônio Carlos Jobim and Dorival Caymmi. The Luiz Gonzaga Dam was named in his honor.

Gonzaga's son, Luiz Gonzaga do Nascimento Jr, known as Gonzaguinha (1945–91), was also a noted Brazilian singer and composer.

Biography

The son of a farmer, Gonzaga was attracted to the accordion at a very early age, and he used to accompany his father at parties and religious celebrations. He later went to do his military service, where he learned to play the cornet. On leaving the army he decided to remain in Rio de Janeiro, performing in the streets and in bars.

After noticing that the north-eastern people living in Rio de Janeiro missed the music from their home states, he started to give listeners the sort of music they craved to hear: xaxados, baiões, chamegos and cocos. At Ary Barroso's talent show, Luiz Gonzaga played his chamego "Vira e Mexe" and was acclaimed by the audience and by the host, who gave him the highest score. After discovering this niche in the market, Gonzaga became a regular at radio shows and started making records.

In 1943, he dressed up in typical north-eastern costumes for the first time to perform live, and got hyped. Later on, as well as playing popular tunes on the accordion, he began to sing his own material, and his skills as a songwriter were revealed. His greatest hit ever, "Asa Branca" (written with Humberto Teixeira), was recorded in 1947 and covered countless times by many artists. He worked on the radio until 1954, enjoying huge popularity.   He became (in the words of Caetano Veloso, Caderno de Confessões Brasileiras, 1988) a "pop music" star, taking a genre straight from folklore to the pop music, creating with the combination of accordion, zabumba, and triangle (which became later the basic ensemble for Forró) one of the western world's first "small pop music ensembles", ten years before the popularization of the rock music ensemble by the Beatles.

He is widely recognized for single-handedly taking the baião style and the accordion to a wide audience. RCA (now BMG), his recording label, was almost exclusively dedicated to printing his singles and albums . During the 1960s, as the public taste shifted to bossa nova and iê-iê-iê, he found himself increasingly stranded from big city stages, so he toured the countryside, where his popularity never abated. 

In the 1970s and 1980s, he slowly re-emerged, partly due to covers of his songs by famous artists like Geraldo Vandré, Caetano Veloso, Gilberto Gil, his son Gonzaguinha and Milton Nascimento. Some of his greatest hits are "Vozes da Seca" ("Voices From Drought"), "Algodão" ("Cotton"), "A Dança da Moda" ("The Dance in Fashion"), "ABC do Sertão" ("The ABC of Sertão"), "Derramaro o Gai" ("They Spilt the Gas"), "A Letra I" ("The 'i' letter"), "Imbalança" ("Shake It"), "A Volta da Asa-Branca" ("The Return of The Picazuro Pigeon"), "Cintura Fina" ("Slender Waist"), "O Xote das Meninas" ("The Girls' Schottische", written with Zé Dantas, and "Juazeiro", "Paraíba", "Mangaratiba", "Baião-de-Dois", "No Meu Pé de Serra" ("There in My Homeland"), "Assum Preto" ("Blue-back Grassquit"), "Légua Tirana" ("Tyrannical league"), "Qui Nem Jiló" ("Like Solanum gilo", written with Humberto Teixeira. Other successful collaborations resulted in "Tá Bom Demais" ("It's So Good") (with Onildo de Almeida), "Danado de Bom" ("Damn Good") (with João Silva), "Dezessete e Setecentos" ("Seventeen And Seven hundred") and "Cortando o Pano" ("Cutting Cloth") (both with Miguel Lima). 

The surname Gonzaga is an ancient noble surname in Brazil, Portugal and Italy.

Gonzaga died of natural causes in 1989 at the age of 76.

Discography

A dança da moda, Luiz Gonzaga and Zé Dantas (1950)
A feira de Caruaru, Onildo Almeida (1957)
A letra I, Luiz Gonzaga and Zé Dantas (1953)
A morte do vaqueiro, Luiz Gonzaga and Nelson Barbalho (1963)
A triste partida, Patativa do Assaré (1964)
A vida do viajante, Hervé Cordovil and Luiz Gonzaga (1953)
Acauã, Zé Dantas (1952)
Adeus, Iracema, Zé Dantas (1962)
Á-bê-cê do sertão, Luiz Gonzaga and Zé Dantas (1953)
Adeus, Pernambuco, Hervé Cordovil and Manezinho Araújo (1952)
Algodão, Luiz Gonzaga and Zé Dantas (1953)
Amanhã eu vou, Beduíno and Luiz Gonzaga (1951)
Amor da minha vida, Benil Santos and Raul Sampaio (1960)
Asa-branca, Humberto Teixeira and Luiz Gonzaga (1947)
Assum-preto, Humberto Teixeira and Luiz Gonzaga (1950)
Ave-maria sertaneja, Júlio Ricardo and O. de Oliveira (1964)
Baião, Humberto Teixeira and Luiz Gonzaga (1946)
Baião da Penha, David Nasser and Guio de Morais (1951)
Beata Mocinha, Manezinho Araújo and Zé Renato (1952)
Boi bumbá, Gonzaguinha and Luiz Gonzaga (1965)
Boiadeiro, Armando Cavalcanti and Klécius Caldas (1950)
Cacimba Nova, José Marcolino and Luiz Gonzaga (1964)
Calango da lacraia, Jeová Portela and Luiz Gonzaga (1946)
O Cheiro de Carolina, – Sua Sanfona and Sua Simpatia – Amorim Roxo and Zé Gonzaga (1998)
Chofer de praça, Evaldo Ruy and Fernando Lobo (1950)
Cigarro de paia, Armando Cavalcanti and Klécius Caldas (1951)
Cintura fina, Luiz Gonzaga and Zé Dantas (1950)
Cortando pano, Jeová Portela, Luiz Gonzaga and Miguel Lima (1945)
De Fiá Pavi (João Silva/Oseinha) (1987)Dezessete légua e meia, Carlos Barroso and Humberto Teixeira (1950)Feira de gado, Luiz Gonzaga and Zé Dantas (1954)Firim, firim, firim, Alcebíades Nogueira and Luiz Gonzaga (1948)Fogo sem fuzil, José Marcolino and Luiz Gonzaga (1965)Fole gemedor, Luiz Gonzaga (1964)Forró de Mané Vito, Luiz Gonzaga and Zé Dantas (1950)Forró de Zé Antão, Zé Dantas (1962)Forró de Zé do Baile, Severino Ramos (1964)Forró de Zé Tatu, Jorge de Castro and Zé Ramos (1955)Forró no escuro, Luiz Gonzaga (1957)Fuga da África, Luiz Gonzaga (1944)Hora do adeus, Luiz Queiroga and Onildo Almeida (1967)Imbalança, Luiz Gonzaga and Zé Dantas (1952)Jardim da saudade, Alcides Gonçalves and Lupicínio Rodrigues (1952)Juca, Lupicínio Rodrigues (1952)Lascando o cano, Luiz Gonzaga and Zé Dantas (1954)Légua tirana, Humberto Teixeira and Luiz Gonzaga (1949)Lembrança de primavera, Gonzaguinha (1964)Liforme instravagante, Raimundo Granjeiro (1963)Lorota boa, Humberto Teixeira e Luiz Gonzaga (1949)Moda da mula preta, Raul Torres (1948)Moreninha tentação, Sylvio Moacyr de Araújo and Luiz Gonzaga (1953)No Ceará não tem disso, não, Guio de Morais (1950)No meu pé de serra, Humberto Teixeira and Luiz Gonzaga (1947)Noites brasileiras, Luiz Gonzaga and Zé Dantas (1954)Numa sala de reboco, José Marcolino and Luiz Gonzaga (1964)O maior tocador, Luiz Guimarães (1965)O xote das meninas, Luiz Gonzaga and Zé Dantas (1953)Ô véio macho, Rosil Cavalcanti (1962)Obrigado, João Paulo, Luiz Gonzaga and Padre Gothardo (1981)O fole roncou, Luiz Gonzaga and Nelson Valença (1973)Óia eu aqui de novo, Antônio Barros (1967)Olha pro céu, Luiz Gonzaga and Peterpan (1951)Ou casa, ou morre, Elias Soares (1967)Ovo azul, Miguel Lima and Paraguaçu (1946)Padroeira do Brasil, Luiz Gonzaga and Raimundo Granjeiro (1955)Pão-duro, Assis Valente and Luiz Gonzaga (1946)Pássaro carão, José Marcolino and Luiz Gonzaga (1962)Pau-de-arara, Guio de Morais and Luiz Gonzaga (1952)Paulo Afonso, Luiz Gonzaga and Zé Dantas (1955)Pé de serra, Luiz Gonzaga (1942)Penerô xerém, Luiz Gonzaga and Miguel Lima (1945)Perpétua, Luiz Gonzaga and Miguel Lima (1946)Piauí, Sylvio Moacyr de Araújo (1952)Piriri, Albuquerque and João Silva (1965)Quase maluco, Luiz Gonzaga and Victor Simon (1950)Quer ir mais eu?, Luiz Gonzaga and Miguel Lima (1947)Quero chá, José Marcolino and Luiz Gonzaga (1965)Padre sertanejo, Helena Gonzaga and Pantaleão (1964)Respeita Januário, Humberto Teixeira and Luiz Gonzaga (1950)Retrato de Um Forró,Luiz Ramalho and Luiz Gonzaga (1974)Riacho do Navio, Luiz Gonzaga and Zé Dantas (1955)Sabiá, Luiz Gonzaga and Zé Dantas (1951)Sanfona do povo, Luiz Gonzaga and Luiz Guimarães (1964)Sanfoneiro Zé Tatu, Onildo Almeida (1962)São-joão na roça, Luiz Gonzaga and Zé Dantas (1952)Siri jogando bola, Luiz Gonzaga and Zé Dantas (1956)Tropeiros da Borborema, Raimundo Asfora / Rosil CavalcanteVem, morena, Luiz Gonzaga and Zé Dantas (1950)Vira-e-mexe, Luiz Gonzaga (1941)Xanduzinha, Humberto Teixeira and Luiz Gonzaga (1950)Xote dos cabeludos'', José Clementino and Luiz Gonzaga (1967)

References

External links

 Gonzagao Online (Portuguese)
 Rei do Baião (Portuguese)

1912 births
1989 deaths
Brazilian accordionists
20th-century Brazilian male singers
20th-century Brazilian singers
Brazilian percussionists
Triangle players
People from Pernambuco
20th-century accordionists